"What Can I Say After I Say I'm Sorry?" is a popular song by Walter Donaldson and Abe Lyman, published in 1926.

The song has become a popular and jazz standard, recorded by many artists.

Notable recordings
Josephine Baker! (1926)
Irving Kaufman, link Irving Kaufman (singer) aka Frank Harris(1926)
Ruth Etting (1926)
Jean Goldkette & His Orchestra - recorded on January 28, 1926 for Victor (catalog No. 19947B).
Sam Lanin - recorded on January 15, 1926 for Banner Records (catalog No. 1693).
California Ramblers (1926)
Ella Fitzgerald - recorded for Decca Records (catalog No. 2826B) on October 12, 1939.
Tommy Dorsey - recorded on February 1, 1940 for Victor Records (catalog No. 26518).
Jack Jenney & His Orchestra - recorded on January 30, 1940 for Vocalion (catalog No. 5494).
Bobby Hackett & His Orchestra - recorded on January 25, 1940 for Okeh Records (catalog No. 5620).
Will Bradley & His Orchestra (vocal by Ray McKinley). This charted briefly in the Billboard chart at No. 26.
The King Cole Trio - included in the album The King Cole Trio (vol. 2) (1946)
Benny Goodman - B.G. in Hi-Fi (1954).
Peggy Lee - for the album Songs from Pete Kelly's Blues (1955)
Buddy DeFranco - Sweet and Lovely (1956).
Keely Smith - Swingin' Pretty (1959)
Jo Stafford - Jo + Jazz (1960)
Bobby Darin - for his album Winners (1964)
Dean Martin - included in his album The Dean Martin TV Show (1966)
Oscar Peterson - With Respect to Nat (1966)
Carmen McRae - Fine and Mellow: Live at Birdland West (1986)

References

1926 songs
Songs written by Abe Lyman
Songs with music by Walter Donaldson
Ella Fitzgerald songs
Jo Stafford songs
Carmen McRae songs